Khanchali Managed Reserve is a protected area in Ninotsminda Municipality in Samtskhe-Javakheti region of Georgia. It protects Khanchali Lake on the south-eastern part of the volcanic Javakheti Plateau, at an altitude of 1928 meters above sea level.
Khanchali Lake has been considered to be included into Ramsar Convention list of  Wetlands of international importance.

Khanchali Managed Reserve is part of Javakheti Protected Areas which also includes Javakheti National Park, Kartsakhi Managed Reserve, Sulda Managed Reserve, Bugdasheni Managed Reserve, Madatapa Managed Reserve.

Fauna 
Lake provide habitat to many birds, such as Long-legged Buzzard (Buteo rufinus), Green Warbler   (Phylloscopus nitidus) to name just a few.

See also
 Javakheti National Park

References 

Managed reserves of Georgia (country)
Protected areas established in 2011
Geography of Samtskhe–Javakheti
Tourist attractions in Samtskhe–Javakheti